Mohammad Aslam Uqaili is Former Vice Chancellor of Mehran University of Engineering and Technology, Jamshoro, Pakistan and a Professor in the Department of Electrical Engineering.

Uqaili graduated with a Bachelor of Engineering in Electrical and Electronics Engineering from NED University of Engineering and Technology in 1986. He has earned masters and doctoral degrees in electrical engineering and masters in economics.

Show 2 more education

References

External links 
Faculty Members - Department of Electrical Engineering
Vice Chancellor's Message

Pakistani electrical engineers
Living people
Academic staff of Mehran University of Engineering & Technology
Vice-Chancellors of the Mehran University of Engineering & Technology
Year of birth missing (living people)
NED University of Engineering & Technology alumni